The Wisconsin Range is a major mountain range of the Horlick Mountains in Antarctica, comprising the Wisconsin Plateau and numerous glaciers, ridges and peaks bounded by the Reedy Glacier, Shimizu Ice Stream, Horlick Ice Stream and the interior ice plateau.

The range was mapped by the USGS from surveys and U.S. Navy air photos, 1959–64. Named by US-ACAN for the University of Wisconsin–Madison, Madison, Wisconsin, which has sent numerous researchers to Antarctica.

Most of the upland surface area of the range is the Wisconsin Plateau, a large ice-capped plain with general elevations above . To the east and southeast, the plateau descends gradually and with only minor ice escarpments to merge with the interior ice plateau; to the north and west, the plateau displays abrupt escarpments and cliffs of over 1,000 metres. Mapped by USGS from surveys and U.S. Navy air photos, 1960–64. Named by US-ACAN in association with the Wisconsin Range.


List of mountains 
This range includes the following mountains and peaks:

Faure Peak 
Faure Peak is a peak, 3,940 m, standing 3.5 mi E of Mount Minshew along the northern side of Wisconsin Plateau. Mapped by USGS from surveys and U.S. Navy air photos, 1960–64. Named by US-ACAN for Gunter Faure, leader of the Ohio State University geological party to the Horlick Mountains, 1964–65.

Koopman Peak 
Koopman Peak is a peak over 2,200 m, standing 2 mi N of Moran Buttress on the northern side of the range. Mapped by USGS from surveys and U.S. Navy air photos, 1960–64. Named by US-ACAN for Kenneth E. Koopman, Navy yeoman on Operation Deep Freeze 1965–67.

Mount LeSchack 
Mount LeSchack is a distinctive flat-topped mountain standing on the north side of Perkins Canyon. Mapped by USGS from surveys and U.S. Navy air photos, 1959–60. Named by US-ACAN for Leonard A. LeSchack, traverse seismologist, Byrd Station winter party, 1958.

Mount Minshew 
Mount Minshew is a prominent, mainly ice-covered mountain with a small exposed summit peak, 3,895 m, standing 3.5 mi W of Faure Peak at the NW extremity of the elevated plateau portion of the range. Mapped by USGS from surveys and U.S. Navy air photos, 1960–64. Named by US-ACAN for Velon H. Minshew, geologist with the Ohio State University geologic party to the Horlick Mountains, 1964–65.

Sheets Peak 
Sheets Peak is a peak over 1,800 m, standing 1 mile (1.6 km) northwest of Koopman Peak on the north side of the range. Mapped by USGS from surveys and U.S. Navy air photos, 1960–64. Named by US-ACAN for Joseph D. Sheets, journalist on U.S. Navy Operation Deep Freeze 1965–67.

Mount Soyat 
Mount Soyat is a prominent mountain in the western side of the Wisconsin Range, rising on the east side of Reedy Glacier just north of the junction of Norfolk Glacier. Mapped by USGS from surveys and U.S. Navy air photos, 1960–64. Named by US-ACAN for Commander David Soyat, U.S. Navy, air operations officer with Squadron VX-6 at McMurdo Station, winter 1962.

Key Geological features

Gierloff Nunataks 
Gierloff Nunataks is a group of nunataks lying 8 nautical miles (15 km) northwest of Lentz Buttress, at the northern side of the range.  Mapped by USGS from surveys and U.S. Navy air photos, 1960–64.  Named by US-ACAN after George B. Gierloff, builder, Byrd Station winter party, 1961.

Lentz Buttress 
Lentz Buttress is a prominent rock bluff 5 mi ENE of Faure Peak, rising to 2,800 m and forming a projection along the northern side of the Wisconsin Plateau. Mapped by USGS from surveys and U.S. Navy air photos, 1960–64. Named by US-ACAN for Lieutenant Malcolm W. Lentz, U.S. Navy, officer in charge of the South Pole Station winter party, 1962.

Perkins Canyon 
Perkins Canyon is a canyon at the head of Quonset Glacier, between Ruseski Buttress and Mount LeSchack, along the northern side of the range. Mapped by USGS from surveys and U.S. Navy air photos, 1959–60. Named by US-ACAN for David M. Perkins, geomagnetist, Byrd Station winter party, 1961.

Ruseski Buttress 
Ruseski Buttress is a buttress rock or spur forming the south portal to Perkins Canyon along the northern side of the range. Mapped by USGS from surveys and U.S. Navy air photos, 1959–60. Named for Lieutenant Peter P. Ruseski (MC) U.S. Navy, of the Byrd Station winter party, 1958.

Features

 Angus Nunatak
 Baker Nunatak
 Brinton Nunatak
 Davisville Glacier
 Feeley Peak
 Ford Nunataks
 Garczynski Nunatak
 Gibbon Nunatak
 Goodwin Peak
 Griffith Peak
 Haworth Mesa
 Hueneme Glacier
 Martens Peak
 McCrilliss Nunatak
 Mickler Spur
 Moran Buttress
 Mount Bolton
 Mount Brecher
 Mount Frontz
 Mount Huckaby
 Mount McNaughton
 Mount Neder
 Mount Sweatt
 Mount Vito
 Murtaugh Peak
 Norfolk Glacier
 Quonset Glacier
 Reedy Glacier
 Saunders Rock
 Sisco Mesa
 Spencer Nunatak
 Spiers Nunatak
 Walters Peak
 Widich Nunatak

References

Mountain ranges of Marie Byrd Land
Transantarctic Mountains
University of Wisconsin–Madison